Horst Weigang (born 30 September 1940) is a German former footballer who played as a goalkeeper.

In the Oberliga, Weigang appeared in 234 matches for SC Lokomotive Leipzig, SC Turbine/FC Rot-Weiß Erfurt, and SC Rotation/SC/1. FC Lokomotive Leipzig. He represented the East Germany national team between 1962 and 1968.

Weigang is the father of swimmer Birte Weigang, and his son Sven was also a footballer.

References

External links
 
 
 

1940 births
Living people
People from Bielawa
People from the Province of Silesia
German footballers
Association football goalkeepers
East German footballers
East Germany international footballers
Olympic footballers of the United Team of Germany
Olympic bronze medalists for the United Team of Germany
Olympic medalists in football
Footballers at the 1964 Summer Olympics
Medalists at the 1964 Summer Olympics
1. FC Lokomotive Leipzig players
FC Rot-Weiß Erfurt players
DDR-Oberliga players
Sportspeople from Lower Silesian Voivodeship